Gymnopilus rufobrunneus is a species of mushroom-forming fungus in the family Hymenogastraceae.

Description

Habitat and distribution
Gymnopilus rufobrunneus grows in clusters on the ground, and has been found in Idaho during September.

See also

List of Gymnopilus species

References

rufobrunneus
Fungi of North America
Fungi described in 1969
Taxa named by Lexemuel Ray Hesler